"Nothing Matters" is the debut single by Jess & Matt, the series seven third place-getters of The X Factor Australia. "Nothing Matters" was written by Anthony Egizii and David Musumeci of DNA Songs and Adam Argyle and would've been the duo's winning single. The song debuted at number 29 on the ARIA Singles Chart.

Track listing
Digital download
 "Nothing Matters" – 3:02

Charts

Release history

References

2015 songs
2015 debut singles
Songs written by David Musumeci
Songs written by Anthony Egizii
Song recordings produced by DNA Songs
Sony Music Australia singles
Songs written by Adam Argyle